The 1993 English cricket season was the 94th in which the County Championship had been an official competition. It included the debut in England of Shane Warne and his "Gatting Ball". Australia, led by Allan Border, won the Ashes series 4-1. Mike Gatting led Middlesex to another Britannic Assurance County Championship.

Honours
County Championship - Middlesex
NatWest Trophy - Warwickshire
Sunday League - Glamorgan
Benson & Hedges Cup - Derbyshire
Minor Counties Championship - Staffordshire
MCCA Knockout Trophy - Staffordshire
Second XI Championship - Middlesex II 
Wisden - David Boon, Ian Healy, Merv Hughes, Shane Warne, Steve Watkin

Ashes tour

Zimbabwe tour
The Zimbabwe national cricket team made a short tour of England in August and September. They played two limited overs and three first-class matches, mainly against county opposition.

County Championship

NatWest Trophy

Benson & Hedges Cup

Sunday League

References

Annual reviews
 Playfair Cricket Annual 1994
 Wisden Cricketers' Almanack 1994

English cricket seasons in the 20th century
English Cricket Season, 1993
Cricket season